Faaone is an associated commune located in the commune of Taiarapu-Est on the island of Tahiti, in French Polynesia.

References

External links

Towns and villages in Tahiti